Salviamo la montagna muore is a 1952 Italian film.

Cast

External links
 

1952 films
1950s Italian-language films
Italian documentary films
1952 documentary films
1950s Italian films